Shekou Port station is a metro station on Line 2 of the Shenzhen Metro. It was opened on 28 December 2010. This station helped serve the population travelling via the former Shekou Passenger Terminal, which is the origin of the station name. A shuttle bus runs from there (Exit C) to the new Shekou Cruise Center.

In early planning, this station was the southwestern terminus of Line 2.

Station layout

Exits

References

External links
 Shenzhen Metro Shekou Port Station (Chinese)
 Shenzhen Metro Shekou Port Station (English)

Shenzhen Metro stations
Railway stations in Guangdong
Nanshan District, Shenzhen
Railway stations in China opened in 2010